Dil Apna Aur Preet Parai is a 1960 Indian Hindi-language romantic drama film, produced by S. A. Bagar. It was written and directed by Kishore Sahu. The film stars Raaj Kumar, Meena Kumari and Nadira as leads. The film tells the story of a surgeon who is obligated to marry the daughter of a family friend, while he is in love with a colleague nurse, played by Meena Kumari. It is one of the noted acting performances of lead actress Meena Kumari's career.

The film's music is by Shankar Jaikishan, and features a hit song, "Ajeeb Dastan Hai Yeh", which has since then attained an iconic status. At the 1961 Filmfare Awards it created an upset by beating the popular musical epic, Mughal-e-Azam of Naushad, for the Best Music Director category.

Plot 
Sushil Verma is a surgeon in the Shimla Hospital. He lives on the hospital grounds in a doctor's house with his aging mother and younger sister Munni. After Sushil's father died, his father's close friend paid Sushil's medical school fees, thus creating a debt that Sushil's mother feels needs to be fulfilled. Karuna is a nurse who comes to Shimla Hospital and first encounters Sushil during an emergency surgery. Both are clearly besotted with each other, but keep their feelings restrained.

By chance, on a nurses' beach day trip, Karuna meets Munni, who injures herself whilst playing. She takes Munni back to her house, not knowing that she is Dr. Verma's sister, and the house she is visiting belongs to him. She dresses Munni's wounds, sees how much work needs to be done in the house, and the fact that his mother is too ill to attend to household tasks. She immediately steps in and fulfills the duties of the housewife; cooking, cleaning and taking care of everyone. Sushil comes home to see this and falls even more in love.

However, later on, his mother organises a trip to Kashmir for the whole family, and conveniently guilt-trips Sushil into marrying Kusum, the daughter of the man who paid for his medical school fees.

They come back to Shimla, and Karuna is devastated when she finds this out. Although she manages to conceal this for a while, situations keep arising and Kusum soon gets jealous of Sushil's preference for Karuna, and her perceived ill-treatment. Kusum manipulates and mistreats her mother-in-law and sister-in-law, until Sushil orders her out of the house. She goes back to Kashmir.

Dr. Verma's mother then realises her mistake, that she should have gotten him married to Karuna.

To avoid scandal, Karuna moves to another hospital. But Kusum seeks to enact revenge on her. Dr. Verma finds this out and tries to beat Kusum to Karuna, which leads to a clifftop high speed car chase, resulting in Kusum's death. The film concludes with the reunion of Karuna and Sushil.

Cast 
Raaj Kumar as Dr. Sushil K. Verma
Meena Kumari as Karuna
Nadira as Kusum
Ruby Myers as Head Nurse
Tun Tun as Haseena
Om Prakash as Girdhari
Shammi as Sheela
Kumari Naaz as Munni
Pratima Devi as Mrs. K. Verma (as Protima Devi)
Edwina as Nurse Rosie
Helen as Cabaret Dancer
Raj Kishore as Singer in item song, 'Jane Kahan Gayi'

Soundtrack 
The Hawaiian-themed song "Ajeeb Dastan Hai Yeh" is based on "My Lips Are Sealed" by Jim Reeves.

Awards 
1961 Filmfare Award for Best Music Director for Shankar Jaikishan

References

External links 

1960 films
1960s Hindi-language films
Films scored by Shankar–Jaikishan
Films set in Himachal Pradesh
Films directed by Kishore Sahu
Indian black-and-white films
Indian romantic drama films